Ata Öweznepesowiç Serdarow (born 1964) is a Turkmen physician, diplomat, and politician. From 2018, he is serving as the leader of politically dominant Democratic Party of Turkmenistan.

Early life and education 
Serdarow was born in the village of Yasman-Salyk in the Ruhabat District of the Turkmen SSR in 1964. He graduated from the Turkmen State Medical University in 1987 with a Candidate of Sciences degree. Until 2005, he worked as a surgeon and a professor at the Turkmen State Medical University.

Political career 
He became the Minister of Health on 27 February 2007 and served until 9 April 2010. In July 2010, he was appointed as Turkmenistan's ambassador to Armenia and worked in the position until December 2012 when he was dismissed from the post and appointed as the ambassador to Turkey. On 16 September 2013, he was appointed as the ambassador to Israel while simultaneously serving as the ambassador to Turkey. On 26 February 2016, Serdarow was appointed as the ambassador to Belgium, he was dismissed from his position as ambassador to Israel and Turkey. On 26 March 2016, he presented his credentials to King Philippe of Belgium. 

As of 2018, he was the ambassador to Belgium, the Netherlands, and Luxembourg. On 3 March 2018, Ata Serdarow was appointed as the Head of Turkmenistan Representation to the European Union. He was elected as the Chairman of the Democratic Party of Turkmenistan on 2 April 2018. Three days later on 5 April 2018, he was relieved from all diplomatic posts by President Gurbanguly Berdimuhamedow.

References 

1964 births
People from Ahal Region
Turkmenistan diplomats
Ambassadors of Turkmenistan to Armenia
Ambassadors of Turkmenistan to Turkey
Ambassadors of Turkmenistan to Israel
Ambassadors of Turkmenistan to Belgium
Ambassadors of Turkmenistan to the Netherlands
Turkmenistan physicians
Turkmenistan politicians
Living people
Democratic Party of Turkmenistan politicians
Turkmen State Medical University alumni
Health ministers of Turkmenistan